The 2018–19 Yale Bulldogs Men's ice hockey season was the 124th season of play for the program and the 58th season in the ECAC Hockey conference. The Bulldogs represented Yale University and were coached by Keith Allain, in his 13th season.

Season
Yale began the season well, rising up their conference standings and earning a top-20 ranking after a 5-game winning streak. The Bulldogs would slowly drop out of the rankings with several up and down weeks but looked like they had recovered some of their early season success after defeating #8 Cornell. After that match, however, Yale lost its final 4 games of the regular season and missed a chance to earn a first-round bye for the ECAC Tournament.

The Bulldogs took care of Rensselaer fairly easily, however, in the quarterfinals they were defeated by Clarkson and ended the season with a .500 record.

During the year, goaltenders Sam Tucker and Corbin Kaczperski shared the net. They produced similar numbers and had roughly equal success in net.

Departures

Recruiting

Roster

Standings

Schedule and results

|-
!colspan=12 style="color:white; background:#00356B" | Regular Season

|-
!colspan=12 style="color:white; background:#00356B" | 

|-
!colspan=12 style="color:white; background:#00356B" | 

|- align="center" bgcolor="#e0e0e0"
|colspan=12|Yale Won Series 2–0

|- align="center" bgcolor="#e0e0e0"
|colspan=12|Yale Lost Series 0–2

Scoring statistics

Goaltending statistics

Rankings

Awards and honors

ECAC Hockey

Players drafted into the NHL

2019 NHL Entry Draft
No Yale players were selected in the NHL draft.

References

Yale Bulldogs men's ice hockey seasons
Yale Bulldogs
Yale Bulldogs
Yale Bulldogs men's ice hockey
Yale Bulldogs men's ice hockey